Ardmore is an unincorporated community and census-designated place (CDP) spanning the border between Delaware and Montgomery counties in the U.S. state of Pennsylvania. The population was 12,455 at the 2010 census and had risen to 13,566 in the 2020 census. 

Ardmore is a suburb on the west side of Philadelphia within Lower Merion Township in Montgomery County and Haverford Township in Delaware County. Originally named "Athensville" in 1853, the community and its railroad station were renamed Ardmore in 1873 by the Pennsylvania Railroad, on whose Main Line, west out of Philadelphia, Ardmore sits at Milepost 8.5. The Autocar Company moved its headquarters to Ardmore in 1899 and constructed a factory on the edge of the downtown area. The factory closed in 1954; during demolition in 1956, a major fire broke out that threatened the downtown area before it was extinguished. Today, Ardmore consistently ranks among the most desirable suburbs of Philadelphia.

Geography
Ardmore is adjacent to Wynnewood (east), Haverford (west), Gladwyne (north), and Havertown (southwest). 

Ardmore's downtown, primarily centered around Lancaster Ave, Rittenhouse Place, and Cricket Ave, is home to many shops, restaurants, and small businesses. The western end of downtown features more traditional retail establishments, including the Ardmore West and Ardmore Plaza Shopping Centers. Similarly, the eastern portion of Ardmore along Lancaster Ave is home to several car dealerships, offices, and apartments, as well as the Wynnewood Plaza Shopping Center. Suburban Square, opened in 1928 as one of the earliest shopping centers in the United States, is located just north of the Ardmore train station. Ardmore contained the nation's first suburban branch of a major department store, the former Strawbridge & Clothier which opened there in 1930; the former Suburban movie theater—now Not Your Average Joe's Restaurant; the newly relocated Ardmore Farmer's Market; an Apple Store, and the usual selection of mall shops. 

The Merion Golf Manor neighborhood, named for the adjacent Merion Golf Club, is roughly bounded by Ardmore Avenue to the north, Darby Road to the West, Hathaway Lane to the South, and the Norristown High Speed Line to the East. Another neighborhood in the Haverford Township portion of town is Ardmore Park, roughly bounded by Haverford Road to the South, Ardmore Avenue to the west, and County Line Road to the North. While originally developed and marketed as Ardmore Park, today it is more commonly referred to today as South Ardmore (not to be confused with a separate housing development of the same name located in nearby Havertown). This neighborhood is home to Normandy Park, Chestnutwold Elementary, and businesses along Haverford Road and County Line Road.

Residents from portions of southeastern Ardmore and Wynnewood cooperate as the ArdWood Civic Association. The Ardmore Progressive Civic Association serves the historically black section of Ardmore bordered by ArdWood Civic Association, Haverford College, Montgomery Avenue, and the Montgomery/Delaware County line. The North Ardmore Civic Association represents residents of North Ardmore and Wynnewood north of Montgomery Avenue. The South Ardmore Betterment Alliance is a community group in the Haverford Township portion of Ardmore which organizes various community activities.

Residents and visitors enjoy several recreation areas, including Linwood Park, Normandy Park, the Ardmore Ice Skating Club, and Vernon V. Young Memorial Park (home to the Ardmore Ave Pool and the community center known as "The Shack"). South Ardmore Park is located in neighboring Wynnewood, and Merwood Park and Elwell Field are both adjacent to Ardmore. The Ardmore Post Office and Ardmore Public Library (part of the Lower Merion Library System) are both found on Ardmore Ave, and the Merion Fire Company of Ardmore is located nearby on Greenfield Ave.

Two sites, located in the Haverford Township section of Ardmore, the Merion Golf Club East Course and Pont Reading are listed on the National Register of Historic Places.

Transit 
Ardmore's train station is served by SEPTA Regional Rail's Paoli/Thorndale Line (commuter) and Amtrak (intercity) passenger trains. Additionally, the Norristown High Speed Line runs through the Haverford Township portion of town, and Ardmore Junction, Wynnewood Road, and Ardmore Avenue stations are all within or adjacent to the boundaries of Ardmore. 

A streetcar line built by the Ardmore and Llanerch Street Railway in 1902 once ran from the 69th Street Transportation Center in Upper Darby to a two-track terminal in downtown Ardmore, now the site of Schauffele Plaza. After the line was acquired by SEPTA in the 1960s, it was converted to a bus route. A section of the line, running alongside Pont Reading Creek and Hathaway Lane, was paved over and is now used by SEPTA as a private busway.

Demographics

As of the 2010 census, the CDP was 76.8% White, 12.9% Black or African American, 0.1% Native American, 4.1% Asian, 0.1% Native Hawaiian and Other Pacific Islander, 1.2% were Some Other Race, and 2.3% were two or more races. 4.0% of the population were of Hispanic or Latino ancestry.

As of the census of 2000, there were 12,616 people, 5,529 households, and 3,129 families residing in Ardmore.  The population density was 6,588.5 people per square mile (2,550.3/km).  There were 5,711 housing units at an average density of 2,982.5/sq mi (1,154.5/km).  The racial makeup of the CDP was 83.51% White, 11.47% African American, 0.12% Native American, 2.58% Asian, 0.13% Pacific Islander, 0.59% from other races, and 1.60% from two or more races.  Hispanic or Latino of any race were 2.05% of the population.

There were 5,529 households, out of which 23.9% included children under the age of 18, 43.0% were married couples living together, 10.7% had a female householder with no husband present, and 43.4% were non-families. 34.7% of all households were made up of individuals, and 12.5% had someone living alone who was 65 years of age or older.  The average household size was 2.27 and the average family size was 2.98.

In the CDP, the population was spread out, with 20.3% under the age of 18, 7.5% from 18 to 24, 32.1% from 25 to 44, 23.1% from 45 to 64, and 17.0% who were 65 years of age or older.  The median age was 38 years. For every 100 females, there were 86.9 males.  For every 100 females age 18 and over, there were 84.9 males.

The median income for a household in the CDP was $60,966, and the median income for a family was $75,828. Males had a median income of $46,920 versus $40,802 for females. The per capita income for the CDP was $36,111.  About 2.4% of families and 4.9% of the population were below the poverty line, including 3.1% of those under age 18 and 6.2% of those age 65 or over.

Education 
Pupils living in the Lower Merion Township portion attend schools in the Lower Merion School District, while pupils living in the Haverford Township portion attend schools in the School District of Haverford Township.

Among the many notable graduates of Lower Merion High School in Ardmore are General Henry H. "Hap" Arnold (1903), Commanding General of the U.S. Army Air Forces in WWII; General Alexander M. Haig, Jr. (1942), the 59th United States Secretary of State; James H. Billington (1946), the Librarian of Congress, and; Kobe Bryant (1996), NBA Hall of Fame basketball player.

Eminent domain controversy

In 2004–2006, Ardmore's business district was the subject of a hotly contested eminent domain battle. A grassroots organization, the Save Ardmore Coalition, along with local businesses and other civic groups, opposed an eminent domain/redevelopment program that would have involved the demolition of historic buildings, in favor of preserving those buildings for other commercial use. In March 2006 the Lower Merion Township Board of Commissioners adopted a resolution disavowing the use of eminent domain for the benefit of private redevelopment projects.  The Ardmore battle was also instrumental in prompting the Pennsylvania General Assembly to enact legislation in 2006 restricting the use of eminent domain for private projects.

Ardmore Presbyterian Church 

The Ardmore Presbyterian Church is a congregation of the Presbyterian Church located at the corner of Montgomery Avenue and Mill Creek Road. The Gothic exterior of the church building is gray stone, with granite trim, and the interior is hardwood.  The original church, now the chapel, was constructed in 1910 following the 1907 establishment of the congregation, whose 50 members worshipped at the local Masonic Hall in the meantime. The first service in the new building was held in September 1910. The current sanctuary, designed by Thomas, Martin & Kirkpatrick, was dedicated in 1924. Subsequent additions were built in 1931 and the 1950s.

J. Howard Pew served as ruling elder of the Ardmore Presbyterian Church beginning January 26, 1958. Pew was president of the board of trustees of the Presbyterian Church (USA) Foundation from 1936 to 1971. When Pew's burial service was held in the church in 1971, the Rev. Billy Graham assisted the pastor, the Rev. William Faulds, with the service.

Notable people
Henry H. "Hap" Arnold, Commanding General of the United States Army Air Forces in all theaters throughout World War II, first United States Air Force five-star general
 Richie Ashburn, Major League Baseball player, member of the Baseball Hall of Fame, outfielder and longtime broadcaster for the Philadelphia Phillies
 Kobe Bryant, National Basketball Association player, member of the Los Angeles Lakers
 Russell Carter, former cornerback for the New York Jets and Los Angeles Raiders
 Larry Christenson, former pitcher for the Philadelphia Phillies
 Johnny Christmas, professional lacrosse player with the Philadelphia Wings and the Boston Cannons
 Kate Flannery, actress (plays Meredith on NBC prime time comedy series The Office)
 Mark Gerban, first person to represent the State of Palestine at the World Championships in rowing
 Alexander Haig, United States Army general, Chairman of the Joint Chiefs of Staff, and United States Secretary of State
 Owen Jones, U.S. Representative from Pennsylvania
 A. Atwater Kent, prominent early radio manufacturer and philanthropist responsible for creation of the Museum of Philadelphia History on South Seventh Street in Center City Philadelphia
 Mike Pedicin, American jazz bandleader
 J. Howard Pew, son of Joseph Newton Pew, founder of Sun Oil Company; his estate "Knollbrook" is located on a tall hill barely visible above the intersection of Grays Lane and Mill Creek Road, touching Ardmore, Gladwyne, and Haverford
 Michael Sembello, an American singer, guitarist, keyboardist, songwriter, composer and producer

Fictional
 Lieutenant Joe Cable, from the Rodgers and Hammerstein musical South Pacific

References

External links

 Ardmore Initiative, a business district authority responsible for physical and economic development in Ardmore
 Save Ardmore Coalition, a 501(c)4 civic group which played a role in the eminent domain controversy
 ArdWood Civic Association, a civic group which focuses on South Ardmore and parts of Wynnewood (surrounding South Ardmore Park)
 South Ardmore Betterment Alliance, a civic group which focuses on southern Ardmore
 First Friday, a 501(c)3 non-profit to bring art to the Main Line and revitalize the communities of Ardmore, Haverford, and Bryn Mawr

Philadelphia Main Line
Lower Merion Township, Pennsylvania
Haverford Township, Pennsylvania
Census-designated places in Montgomery County, Pennsylvania
Census-designated places in Delaware County, Pennsylvania
Census-designated places in Pennsylvania